Sea Patrol may refer to:
Sea Patrol, an Australian television series from 2007-2011
Sea Patrol (season 1)
Sea Patrol (season 2), known as Sea Patrol II: The Coup
Sea Patrol (season 3), known as Sea Patrol: Red Gold
Sea Patrol (season 4), known as Sea Patrol: The Right Stuff
Sea Patrol (season 5), known as Sea Patrol: Damage Control
Sea Patrol UK, a 6-part British documentary drama television series about several agencies that patrol the English Channel
Part of the name of various real past or present naval units, such as:
The Bering Sea Patrol
North Sea Patrol, a poem by Rudyard Kipling
North Sea Patrol, a 1939 film starring Geoffrey Toone
A part of the Paw Patrol fictional scenario and toy range

See also
Coastguard
Coastal defence and fortification
Maritime security